Mate Pavić and Michael Venus were the defending champions, but decided not to defend their title.

Konstantin Kravchuk and Denys Molchanov won the title after defeating Jonathan Erlich and Philipp Oswald 4–6, 7–6(7–1), [10–4] in the final.

Seeds

Draw

References
 Main Draw

Israel Open - Doubles
Israel Open